Minnesota wine refers to wine made from grapes grown in the U.S. state of Minnesota.  Minnesota is part of the largest American Viticultural Area (AVA), the Upper Mississippi River Valley AVA, which includes southwest Wisconsin, southeast Minnesota, northeast Iowa, and northwest Illinois.  The state also has a smaller designated American Viticultural Areas, the Alexandria Lakes AVA.  Minnesota is a very cold climate for viticulture and many grape varieties require protection from the winter weather by being buried under soil for the season.  Minnesota is home to extensive research on cold-hardy French hybrid and other grape varieties.

The  Minnesota Grape Growers Association (MGGA) is a statewide organization that promotes grape growing and wine making in the state and also in cold-hardy climates.  Minnesota is home to the International Cold Climate Wine Competition (ICCWC) hosted annually in partnership between MGGA and University of Minnesota.  This is the only wine competition solely dedicated to the promotion of quality wines made mainly from cold-hardy grape varieties.  In 2014, the 6th annual competition saw 284 wines entered from 59 commercial wineries in 11 states.  Awards were based on blind tastings by 21 expert judges, who include enologists, wine writers, restaurateurs, retailers, and wine educators.

History
The first modern winery in Minnesota, Northern Vineyards Winery, opened in 1977.  In 1973, the first recorded vineyard in Minnesota was planted by David Bailly at Alexis Bailly Vineyard in Hastings, MN.  In 1978, Minnesota and Alexis Bailly Vineyard celebrated the production of the first wine commercially produced of 100% Minnesota grapes. In 1997, only 3 wineries existed in Minnesota. Today over 40 wineries have commercial operations in Minnesota.

Influence of Elmer Swenson
Horticulturalist Elmer Swenson created commercially successful, cold-climate varieties in Minnesota including the Edelweiss and St. Croix grapes. Oenology programs at the University of Minnesota developed the Frontenac grape variety in 1995, and continue to research new hybrids and techniques for grape growing in the state and other cold climate regions.

See also
American wine
Upper Mississippi Valley AVA

References

 
Wine regions of the United States by state